The great Battle of Mount Zemaraim was reported in the Bible to have been fought in Mount Zemaraim, when the army of the Kingdom of Israel led by the king Jeroboam I encountered the army of the Kingdom of Judah led by the king Abijah I. About 500,000 Israelites were said to have lain dead after this single engagement, though most modern commentators consider the numbers to be either wildly exaggerated or symbolic, and some have even questioned its fundamental historicity. A chronology proposed by Edwin Thiele suggests the battle would have taken place around 913 BC.

Background 
The friction all began when the late king Rehoboam increased the royal taxes throughout the Kingdom of Israel after Solomon died in about 931 BCE. This created discontent among all the Israelite tribes of the kingdom, excepting Judah and Benjamin, and the people's discontent soon became a rebellion when the king, against the advice of the elders, refused to lessen the burdens of royal taxation. The ten northern tribes of Israel eventually broke up from the kingdom and made a new Kingdom of Israel with the former fugitive and exile Jeroboam as king, provoking a civil war. Rehoboam then went to war against the new kingdom with a force of 180,000 soldiers, but was advised against fighting his brethren, so he returned to Jerusalem.

Prelude 
Ever since the unified kingdom was divided, there had been constant border issues between the two parties, and both attempted to settle them. Abijah succeeded to the throne after the death of his father Rehoboam, and attempted to reunite all of Israel, including Judah, under his rule. According to Biblical sources, Abijah had an army of 400,000, all of them handpicked or conscripted, and Jeroboam had 800,000 warriors.

Battle 
Before the battle, Abijah addressed the armies of Israel, urging them to submit and to let the Kingdom of Israel be whole again. As written in the biblical narrative (2 Chronicles 13:4-12), Abijah then rallied his own troops with an address to all the people of Israel:

Abijah's phrase "God is with us as our head (or leader)" became famous since that event.

However, his plea to Jeroboam was not heeded. Jeroboam had set up an ambush to come from the rear of Abijah's army, so that the latter's army would be fighting on his army's front and rear, executing a giant pincer movement. All of the soldiers of Judah pleaded to God for help, and then the priests blew the trumpets. Abijah was quick in countering this move made by Jeroboam; he ordered his warriors to fight bravely and countered the pincer movement executed by Jeroboam to his warriors, almost utterly crushing the latter's huge army.

The king Abijah and the warriors of Judah who were under his command had won the day, killing 500,000 Israelite warriors in the process. The rest of the Israelite army fled from the battlefield heading back north, and the forces of Judah then staged a relentless pursuit against them, taking the cities of Bethel, Jeshanah and Ephron during the ensuing pursuit. The factor for Judah's success in the battle is mainly attributed to Abijah and his troops' devotion to their God.

Aftermath 
Jeroboam was crippled by this severe defeat to Abijah and thus posed little threat to the Kingdom of Judah for the rest of his reign; however, despite being victorious, Abijah also failed to reunify Israel and Judah. To conclude, despite the battle being decisive for both sides, this only deepened their division of each other, and these two kingdoms would be engaged in severe border wars for almost two centuries until the Kingdom of Israel's conquest and destruction by Assyria in 720 BC.

See also 
Battle of Qarqar
Northern Kingdom of Israel
Kingdom of Judah
Neo-Assyrian Empire
List of battles before 301
 List of Israelite civil conflicts

References 

Ancient Israel and Judah
Mount Zem
Mount Zemaraim
10th century BC
10th century BC in the Kingdom of Judah